The Supreme Judicial Council of Pakistan is a body of judges empowered under Article 209 of the constitution of Pakistan to hear cases of misconduct against judges.

Constitutional composition
The composition of the Council is set out in the constitution as:

 The Chief Justice
 The two next most senior judges of the Supreme Court of Pakistan
 The two most senior Chief Justices of the provincial High Courts

Where the council is investigating a member of the council he is replaced by the next most senior judge.

Current composition

Powers
No judge of any of the five High Courts or of the Supreme Court of Pakistan may be dismissed except by the President on the report of the Supreme Judicial Council. The Council may start proceedings against a judge either by its own initiative or by reference from the President of Pakistan.

If the Council concludes that the judge is guilty of misconduct and should be removed from office they can recommend this to the President.

A judge of a court or tribunal subordinate to a High Court may be dismissed by the High Court concerned.

List of judges referenced to SJC

References

Judiciary of Pakistan
Judicial misconduct